Per Buckhøj (10 February 1902 – 21 October 1964) was a Danish film actor. He appeared in 36 films between 1942 and 1958.

Partial filmography 

 Flådens blå matroser (1937) – Mand, der trues
  (1942) – Landsretssagfører Berggren
 Det store ansvar (1944) – Mand, der svigter ung gravid pige
 Mordets melodi (1944) – Markussen
  (1944) – Personalechef Vilmer
 Affæren Birte (1945) – Anklager
 Mens sagføreren sover (1945) – Betjent
 De røde enge (1945) – Fangevogter Steinz
 Far betaler (1946) – Bergs bekendt
  (1946) – Direktør
  (1946) – Instruktør
 Så mødes vi hos Tove (1946) – Mogens
 Brevet fra afdøde (1946) – Betjent
 Ditte menneskebarn (1946) – Fuldmægtigen
 The Swedenhielm Family (1947) – Instruktør
 Those Blasted Kids (1947) – Kriminalbetjent Møller
  (1947) – Redaktør
 My Name Is Petersen (1947)
 Mani (1947) – Ingeniør dr.techn. Poul Derling
 Soldaten og Jenny (1947) – Tjeneren
  (1947) – Poul Walter
  (1947)
 Lykke på rejsen (1947) – Turist på hotel
  (1948)
 Støt står den danske sømand (1948) – Kaptajn på Marie Grubbe
 Hvor kunde og sælger mødes (1948)
 Det gælder os alle (1949)
  (1950) – Overtjener
 Det sande ansigt (1951) – Kriminalkommisær
 Meet Me on Cassiopeia (1951) – Mand i kontroltårn
 Det gamle guld (1951) – Hans Sværke
 To minutter for sent (1952) – Kriminalassistenten
 Det store løb (1952) – Henrik Hein
 Vi arme syndere (1952) – Planlægger af parkprojekt
 Adam og Eva (1953) – Svend Aage Johansen
  (1954)
 Min datter Nelly (1955) – Præst
  (1955) – Kriminalassisten
 Ellehammer-filmen (1957) – Narrator
  (1958, Short) – (voice)
 The Vikings (1958) – Bjorn

References

External links 
 

1902 births
1964 deaths
20th-century Danish male actors
Best Actor Bodil Award winners
Danish male film actors
People from Aarhus